Merleyn Bell (born August 23, 1980) is an American politician who has served in the Oklahoma House of Representatives from the 45th district between 2018 and 2022.

She first ran the Oklahoma House during the 2018 general elections. She announced her retirement from office in 2022.

References

1980 births
Living people
Democratic Party members of the Oklahoma House of Representatives
21st-century American politicians
21st-century American women politicians
Women state legislators in Oklahoma